Clan of Amazons, also known as Clan of the Amazons, is a 1978 Hong Kong film adapted from Xiuhua Dadao of Gu Long's Lu Xiaofeng novel series. The film was directed by Chor Yuen, produced by the Shaw Brothers Studio, and starred Tony Liu as the lead character.

Cast
Tony Liu as Lu Xiaofeng
Ching Li as Xue Bing
Ling Yun as Jin Jiuling
Elliot Ngok as Hua Manlou
Shih Szu as Jiang Qingxia
Norman Chui as Jiang Chongwei
Deborah Lee as Ouyang Qing
Mannor Chan as Gongsun First Sister
Cheung Ying as Serpent King
Ngai Fei as Sikong Zhaixing
Lam Fai-wong as Sikong Zhaihua
Ku Kuan-chung as Lu Shaohua
Ouyang Sha-fei as Old Mrs Xue
Yeung Chi-hing as Chang 
Teresa Ha as Gongsun Second Sister
Lau Wai-ling as Gongsun Fifth Sister
Chong Lee as Gongsun Sixth Sister
Kara Hui as Gongsun Seventh Sister
Chan Shen as Lu Wenhu
Cheng Miu
Shum Lo
You Long-sheng
Wang Han-chen
Wong Ching-ho
Yuen Wah
Lam Ching-ying
Yuen Cheung-yan
Yuen Bun
Cheung Sek-au
Ting Tung
Lui Hung
Chen Shao-lung
Wong Pau-gei
Tang Tak-cheung
Lee Hang
Chui Fat
Kong Chuen
Alan Chan Kwok-kuen
Alan Chui Chung-San
Law Keung
Lau Jun-fai
Wong Chi-ming
Cheung Chi-ping
Wong Chi-keung
Fung Ging-man
Leung Sam
Gam Tin-chue
Tsang Chor-lam
Sai Gwa-pau
Fung Ming
Hsu Hsia
Lui Tat

External links

1978 films
1978 martial arts films
Hong Kong martial arts films
Wuxia films
Shaw Brothers Studio films
Works based on Lu Xiaofeng (novel series)
Films directed by Chor Yuen
Films based on works by Gu Long
1970s Hong Kong films